Cychrus sellemi is a species of ground beetle in the subfamily of Carabinae. It was described by Deuve in 2002.

References

sellemi
Beetles described in 2002